Vindicated may refer to:

 Vindicated (book), a 2008 book by former baseball player José Canseco
 "Vindicated" (song), a 2004 song by Dashboard Confessional
 "Vindicated" (Invader Zim), an episode of the American animated series Invader Zim

See also
 Vindication (disambiguation)